The following lists events that happened during 2000 in Indonesia

Incumbents

Events
 Indonesia 2000 census

May
 May 28: 2000 Walisongo school massacre

June
 June 4: The 7.9  Enggano earthquake shakes southwestern Sumatra with a maximum Mercalli intensity of VI (Strong). One-hundred and three people were killed and 2,174–2,585 were injured.

August
 August 1: 2000 Philippine consulate bombing

September
 September 8: United Nations Security Council Resolution 1319
 September 14: Jakarta Stock Exchange bombing

December
 December 24: Christmas Eve 2000 Indonesia bombings

Births
 July 1: Lalu Muhammad Zohri, Indonesian sprinter

References

 
Indonesia
Years of the 20th century in Indonesia
2000s in Indonesia
Indonesia